Kozō Rock is an exposed rock standing on the coast between the Narabi Rocks and Gobamme Rock in Queen Maud Land, Antarctica. It was mapped from surveys and air photos by the Japanese Antarctic Research Expedition, 1957–62, and named Kozō-iwa (youngster rock).

References

Rock formations of Queen Maud Land
Prince Olav Coast